Xerobdella is a genus of annelids belonging to the family Xerobdellidae.

Species
GBIF lists:
 Xerobdella anulata 
 Xerobdella lecomtei 
 Xerobdella praealpina

References

Annelid genera
Leeches